The music of the video game Final Fantasy X was composed by regular series composer Nobuo Uematsu, along with Masashi Hamauzu and Junya Nakano. It was the first title in the main Final Fantasy series in which Uematsu was not the sole composer. The Final Fantasy X Original Soundtrack was released on four Compact Discs in 2001 by DigiCube, and was re-released in 2004 by Square Enix. Prior to the album's North American release, a reduced version entitled Final Fantasy X Official Soundtrack was released on a single disk by Tokyopop in 2002. An EP entitled feel/Go dream: Yuna & Tidus containing additional singles not present in the game was released by DigiCube in 2001. Piano Collections Final Fantasy X, a collection of piano arrangements of the original soundtracks by Masashi Hamauzu and performed by Aki Kuroda, was released by DigiCube in 2002 and re-released by Square EA in 2004. A collection of vocal arrangements of pieces from the game arranged by Katsumi Suyama along with radio drama tracks was released as Final Fantasy X Vocal Collection in 2002 by DigiCube.

The theme song for the game is titled "Suteki da ne", which was performed by Japanese folk singer Ritsuki Nakano, known as "RIKKI". The song was released as a single by DigiCube in 2001 and was re-released by Square Enix in 2004. The game's music was well received overall; reviewers praised the additions to the soundtrack by the two new composers for the series. They especially praised Hamauzu, both for his work in the original soundtrack and in arranging the themes for Piano Collections Final Fantasy X. Several tracks, especially "Suteki da ne" and "To Zanarkand", remain popular today, and have been performed numerous times in orchestral concert series, as well as being published in arranged and compilation albums by Square as well as outside groups.

Creation and influence
Final Fantasy X marks the first time Nobuo Uematsu has had any assistance in composing the score for a Final Fantasy game. His fellow composers for X were Masashi Hamauzu and Junya Nakano. Uematsu contributed 51 tracks, Hamauzu contributed 20 and Nakano contributed 18 tracks to the game. The two new composers were chosen for the soundtrack based on their ability to create music that was different than Uematsu's while still working together. Uematsu states that his music has been inspired by the music of popstar idols such as Elton John and Paul McCartney, and that his favorite part about the soundtrack is the good reviews from listeners. Nakano set out to create music with a "vibrant and dynamic feel" that tied together his years of experience with game music, while Hamauzu tried to use the soundtrack to bring video game music to "greater heights".

"To Zanarkand" was originally written by Uematsu before the development of Final Fantasy X, for the recital of a flutist friend named Seo. Uematsu eventually decided the track was too gloomy and kept it for a later use. When development of X started, he decided to use the track for the game.

Albums

Final Fantasy X Original Soundtrack

 is a soundtrack album of music from Final Fantasy X composed, arranged and produced by Nobuo Uematsu, Masashi Hamauzu and Junya Nakano. Vocals are performed by RIKKI for "Suteki da ne", Bill Muir for "Otherworld", and choruses for "Hymn of the Fayth". It spans four discs and 91 tracks, covering a duration of 4:32:26. It was first released in Japan on August 1, 2001 by DigiCube with catalog number SSCX-10054, and was re-released on May 10, 2004 by Square Enix with catalog number SQEX-10013.

In 2002, Tokyopop released a version of Final Fantasy X Original Soundtrack in North America entitled Final Fantasy X Official Soundtrack, which contained 17 tracks from the original album on a single disk. This release had the catalog number TPCD-0211-2. Additionally, in 2001, prior to the game's release, Square released a promotional disk titled Final Fantasy X Promo CD, which contained edited versions of "Other World", "To Zanarkand", and "Battle 1". The disk covers a length of 7:08, and was only released in Japan.

Final Fantasy X Original Soundtrack reached #4 on the Oricon charts, and sold 140,000 copies as of January 2010. The album was moderately well received; while some reviewers felt it to be an "absolutely amazing" soundtrack, others only found it to be a "satisfying" work. Some reviewers felt that of the three composers, Uematsu's pieces were the weakest, citing them as having a tendency to be "buried" under the compositions of the others. The same reviewers, however, noted that some of the best pieces on the soundtrack, such as "To Zanarkand", were the work of Uematsu. Hamauzu's contributions were seen as some of his best work, and reviewers felt that both he and Nakano brought a "myriad of new flavors" to the soundtrack which were very well received. Final Fantasy X Official Soundtrack, although not re-released after the Original Soundtrack was brought to North America, was seen as a good sampler of the music from the full soundtrack.

Track listing

feel/Go dream: Yuna & Tidus

feel/Go dream: Yuna & Tidus is an EP containing tracks composed by Nobuo Uematsu and inspired by pieces from the game. "feel" was based on the "Hymn of the Fayth", while "Go dream" was based on "Tidus' Theme". Music arrangements were done by Masashi Hamauzu, Tsuyoshi Sekito, Junya Nakano, and Masayoshi Kikuchi. Vocals are performed by Mayuko Aoki for the track "feel" and Masakazu Morita for the track "Go dream". A remix of "feel" was included as a bonus track in the Vocal Collection of Final Fantasy X. It was released in Japan by DigiCube on October 11, 2001, bearing the catalog number SSCX-10058. The EP reached #13 on the Oricon charts.

Piano Collections Final Fantasy X

Piano Collections Final Fantasy X is a collection of music from the original soundtrack arranged for the piano by Masashi Hamauzu, and performed by Aki Kuroda. Hamauzu intended the process of arranging the pieces to "consider the groundwork of individual compositions in order to transform these pieces into piano arrangements" rather than simply playing the themes on a piano as they originally sounded. It spans 15 tracks and covers a duration of 56:43. It was first released in Japan on February 20, 2002 by DigiCube with catalog number SSCX-10064, and was re-released on July 22, 2004 by Square Enix with catalog number SQEX-10028.

Piano Collections Final Fantasy X reached #89 on the Oricon charts and sold 2,900 copies. It was very well received, with reviewers finding it to be a "great" album, and stating that it was superior to most video game soundtracks, both piano or otherwise. They especially praised Hamauzu, terming him a "very skilled arranger and performer".

Final Fantasy X Vocal Collection
 is a collection of vocal arrangements of pieces from the game arranged by Katsumi Suyama along with radio drama tracks, performed by the game's characters' voice actors in Japanese. It spans 14 tracks and covers a duration of 42:21. It was released in Japan on December 18, 2002 by DigiCube with catalog number SSCX-10073. The album was poorly received by critics. They found the album, while it had "pretty good" vocals, to have overall poor sound quality and a clichéd musical style.  While "not a horrible album", they found that the collection was overpriced and under-produced. It reached #69 on the Oricon charts, and sold over 11,700 copies.

Songs

Suteki da ne
"Suteki da ne" is the theme song of Final Fantasy X. It was written by Nobuo Uematsu and Kazushige Nojima and was sung by Japanese folk singer Ritsuki Nakano, known as "Rikki", whom the music team contacted while searching for a singer whose music reflected an Okinawan atmosphere. "Suteki da ne" is sung in its original Japanese form in both the Japanese and English versions of Final Fantasy X. The song's title translates to "Isn't It Wonderful?" in English, and its lyrics were written by scenario writer Kazushige Nojima, while Uematsu composed the instrumentals and Shirō Hamaguchi arranged the instrumentals. Like the ballad from Final Fantasy VIII, "Suteki da ne" has an in-game version used in cutscenes together with an orchestrated version used as part of the ending theme.

The song was released as a single by DigiCube on July 18, 2001, and re-released by Square Enix on July 22, 2004. The disk also contains an instrumental version, an unrelated song entitled "Gotsuki-sama ~UTIKISAMA~" ("The Moon"), and a vocal version of Aerith's theme song from Final Fantasy VII titled "Pure Heart". The single covers a duration of 20:35. The original release has a catalog number of SSCX-10053, and the re-release has a catalog number of SQEX-10029. The original release of "Suteki da ne" reached #10 on the Oricon charts, and sold 130,000 copies.

There is also an "autumn version" of the song, also performed by Ritsuki Nakano, released by Universal on October 3, 2001 on the "KANARIA" minialbum together with six unrelated tracks. The release has a catalog number of UMCK-1056. This version of the song, as well as all versions on the single, is also found on the Final Fantasy Single Collection bootleg CD, released by EverAnime with catalog number GM-496, by Archer Records with catalog number SA-007 and by Miya Records with catalog number MICA-0068. An official English translation of the song was created for the Distant Worlds: Music from Final Fantasy concert series and was first performed in Chicago by vocalist Susan Calloway on December 12, 2009.

Otherworld
"Otherworld", the opening theme of Final Fantasy X, was composed by Nobuo Uematsu with lyrics by Alexander O. Smith. It was sung by Bill Muir, the frontman of xtillidiex (pronounced "Till I die"), a death metal band active in Tokyo at the time. The song was already fully formed when Smith was tasked with writing lyrics for it based on a guide track. Smith's lyrics were loosely based on "The Song of Wandering Aengus", a poem by W. B. Yeats. Smith mistook a guitar solo section of the song as another part that he had to fill with lyrics, and so he wrote in a spoken words part in "one of those Limp Bizkit-style breakdowns". Uematsu liked the result and included it in the final song.

Legacy
The Black Mages, a band led by Nobuo Uematsu that arranges music from Final Fantasy video games into a rock music style, have arranged three pieces from Final Fantasy X. These are "Fight With Seymour" from their self-titled album, published in 2003, and "Otherworld" and "The Skies Above", both of which can be found on the album The Skies Above, published in 2004. Uematsu continues to perform certain pieces in his Dear Friends: Music from Final Fantasy concert series. The music of FFX has also appeared in various official concerts and live albums, such as 20020220 Music from Final Fantasy, a live recording of an orchestra performing music from the series including several pieces from the game. Additionally, "Swing de Chocobo" was performed by the Royal Stockholm Philharmonic Orchestra for the Distant Worlds - Music from Final Fantasy concert tour, while "Zanarkand" was performed by the New Japan Philharmonic Orchestra in the Tour de Japon: Music from Final Fantasy concert series. An arrangement of "A Fleeting Dream" was performed on July 9, 2011 at the Symphonic Odysseys concert, which commemorated the music of Uematsu. Independent but officially licensed releases of Final Fantasy X music have been composed by such groups as Project Majestic Mix, which focuses on arranging video game music. Selections also appear on Japanese remix albums, called dojin music, and on English remixing websites.

References

External links
 Nobuo Uematsu's official website
 Square Enix's official music store

Final Fantasy music
Music
Video game soundtracks
Video game music discographies